Conus glorioceanus is a species of sea snail, a marine gastropod mollusk in the family Conidae, the cone snails and their allies.

Like all species within the genus Conus, these snails are predatory and venomous. They are capable of "stinging" humans, therefore live ones should be handled carefully or not at all.

Description
The size of the shell varies between 30 mm and 51 mm.

Distribution
This marine species occurs off the Philippines.

References

 Poppe G.T. & Tagaro S.P. (2009) A spectacular new Conus (Conidae) from the Philippines. Visaya 2(4): 52–56
 Puillandre N., Duda T.F., Meyer C., Olivera B.M. & Bouchet P. (2015). One, four or 100 genera? A new classification of the cone snails. Journal of Molluscan Studies. 81: 1–23

External links
 The Conus Biodiversity website
 

glorioceanus
Gastropods described in 2009